The Codex Sangermanensis II, designated by g2 or 29 (in Beuron system), is a 10th-century Latin manuscript of the New Testament. The text, written on vellum, is a version of the Latin.

Description 

The manuscript contains text of the four Gospels on 166 parchment leaves (21.5 x 14 cm).

The Latin text of the Gospels is a mixed of Old Latin and Vulgate.

History 
It was examined by Samuel Berger, Paul Sabatier, and John Wordsworth. Sabatier published its text.
Currently it is housed at the National Library of France (fond lat. 13169) in Paris.

See also 

 List of New Testament Latin manuscripts
 Codex Sangermanensis I
 Codex Gatianum

References

Further reading 

 Samuel Berger: Histoire de la Vulgate pendant les premiers siècles du Moyen Age. Paris: 1893, p. 48.

Vetus Latina New Testament manuscripts
Vulgate manuscripts
10th-century biblical manuscripts
Bibliothèque nationale de France collections